St. Leon Armenian Cathedral (in Armenian: Սրբոց Ղևոնդյանց Մայր Տաճար) in the city of Burbank, California is an Armenian Apostolic cathedral that was built in 2010. The cathedral is home to the Armenian community in the Southern California area and is located directly across the street to Woodbury University. The cathedral was consecrated by HH Karekin II, Catholicos of All Armenians. The cathedral falls on the northern side of Glenoaks Boulevard and is visible from the Interstate 5 freeway.

References

Armenian Apostolic cathedrals  in the United States
Buildings and structures in Burbank, California
Churches in Los Angeles County, California
Church buildings with domes
Armenian-American culture in California